ArachnoServer is a database storing information on the protein toxins from spider venoms.

References

External links
 

Biological databases
Spider toxins